Tzufim, or Tzufin, is an Israeli settlement in the West Bank.

The international community considers Israeli settlements in the West Bank illegal under international law, but the Israeli government disputes this.

History
According to ARIJ, Israel confiscated  753 dunums of land from  the Palestinian village of Jayyus in order to construct Tzofim.

Tzufim was established in 1989 with assistance from the Amana settlement organization. The population is made up of a mixed group of Orthodox and non-religious Israelis.

The village is located in an area described as the seam zone and its proximity to the Green Line (less than 2 kilometres east of it) and its similar proximity to the Palestinian town of Qalqilyah has made its inclusion on the Israeli side of the West Bank barrier controversial, especially as the looping nature of the barrier's path forms a quasi-enclave of some Arab villages to its south.

References

External links
Village website 

Mixed Israeli settlements
Populated places established in 1989
1989 establishments in the Israeli Civil Administration area

Israeli settlements in the West Bank